Natural-law argument for the existence of God was especially popular in the eighteenth century as a result of the influence of Sir Isaac Newton. As Bertrand Russell argued much later, many of the things we consider to be laws of nature, in fact, are human conventions. Indeed, Albert Einstein has shown that Newton's law of universal gravitation does not have universal application. Russell also thought the idea of God acting in line with reason implies God is subject to laws and wrote:

"If you say, as more orthodox theologians do, that in all the laws which God issues he had a reason for giving those laws rather than others -- the reason, of course, being to create the best universe, although you would never think it to look at it -- if there was a reason for the laws which God gave, then God himself was subject to law, and therefore you do not get any advantage by introducing God as an intermediary. You really have a law outside and anterior to the divine edicts, and God does not serve your purpose, because he is not the ultimate law-giver. In short, this whole argument from natural law no longer has anything like the strength that it used to have."

The argument of natural laws as a basis for God was changed by Christian figures such as Thomas Aquinas, in order to fit biblical scripture and establish a Judeo-Christian teleological law.

References

Arguments for the existence of God
Natural law
 Philosophy of science